The 2014–15 Southern Jaguars basketball team represented Southern University during the 2014–15 NCAA Division I men's basketball season. The Jaguars, led by fourth year head coach Roman Banks, played their home games at the F. G. Clark Center and were members of the Southwestern Athletic Conference. They finished the season 18–17, 13–5 in SWAC play to finish in third place. They advanced to the championship game of the SWAC tournament where they lost to Texas Southern. Had they won the SWAC Tournament, they would not have qualified for the NCAA Tournament due to a postseason ban due to failing to supply usable academic data to the NCAA.

Roster

Schedule

|-
!colspan=9 style="background:#1560BD; color:#FFD700;"| Regular season

|-
!colspan=9 style="background:#1560BD; color:#FFD700;"| SWAC tournament

References

Southern Jaguars basketball seasons
Southern
South
South